or  (Latin, lit., 'divine concurrence') is a theological and philosophical teaching that divine activity runs parallel to the activity of people and things. This notion allegedly resolves the dichotomy between "acts of nature or humans" vs. "acts of God." Thus, creatures immediately are propelled by God not only according to their origin (creation) and conservation in existence, but also in their causal operations.

Biblical support 

In support of the concept a biblical passage in the Book of Isaiah is often cited: "indeed, all that we have done, you [God] have done for us." (Isaiah 26:12 NRSV). In the New Testament I Corinthians is often cited. There the apostle Paul commented upon his missionary work, "I labored more than anyone else--yet it was not I but the grace of God working through me." (I Corinthians 15:10).

In Catholic theology 

Thomists insist on both kinds of  being required in any action of a created cause and provide an elaborate theory of the "previous ", calling it physical premotion. Other theological schools, especially the Jesuits, typically reject physical premotion and claim that  is sufficient.

Whereas the ordinary  is part of the natural order and accompanies every causal activity of a secondary cause whatsoever, an extraordinary  is of supernatural order, it is the extraordinary help of divine grace to a created free agent.

Examples

Adherents to Concursus Dei believe that when a person is healed of an illness, God should be given the credit for it; and yet the means by which the healing often occurs are the various human and technological instruments that God used: the medical professionals, medicines, foods, therapies, technology, and the prayers of the saints. God can heal apart from these means, but his ordinary method of accomplishing his will is through such means. His end (healing) runs concurrent with these means (hospitals, etc.) Therefore, though God is the active agent in accomplishing these ends, we do not neglect the role of concurrent human operations in the accomplishment of the results, whether it is medicine or prayer or both. The end is harmonized with the means.

Important in this context is the matter of faith. Concursus Dei leads to the confession that faith is purely a gift of God, yet the means by which God dispenses this gift is the preaching of the gospel (see Romans 10:14).

Though God is to be credited for one’s education, God has determined that the concurrent means of this divine gift is schooling. Though God is to be credited for the bodybuilder’s chiseled physique, the concurrent means by which God generally dispenses this gift is a proper diet and the gymnasium. Prayer also runs concurrent with God accomplishing the ends that the petitioner desires. Could God provide those ends without the prayer? Of course, yes, and on rare occasions He does. But in His ordinary operations, God operates concurrently with the activity of humans.

Proponents 

Notable proponents of this teaching include the renowned German philosopher Leibniz, as well as Descartes and Spinoza. It is also a concept invoked by modern Calvinist theologians.

In Catholic theology, the doctrine of divine  is considered a sententia communis and is shared by almost all theologians (a notable exception being Durandus of Saint-Pourçain). The most important proponents of the Thomist version are Domingo Báñez and Diego Álvarez; while their most notable Jesuit opponents are Luis de Molina and Francisco Suárez.

References

External links
 R.C. Sproul, "Divine Concurrence"
 Encyclopedia.com
 Francis Turretin, "Divine Concurrence."
 Blackwell Dictionary of Western Philosophy

Latin words and phrases
Catholic theology and doctrine